The Philippines national basketball team, led by head coach Tab Baldwin, participated at one of the three the FIBA World Olympic Qualifying Tournaments which was hosted at home after failing to win the final against China at the 2015 FIBA Asia Championship where the champion automatically qualified for the 2016 Summer Olympics.

The Gilas Cadets led by head coach Nash Racela participated at the regional 2016 SEABA Cup.

Record

Uniforms

Tournaments

SEABA Cup

Preliminary round

Final

Imperial Basketball City Tournament

Semifinal

Third place game

FIBA World Olympic Qualifying Tournament

FIBA Asia Challenge

Preliminary round

Second round

Exhibition games

Rosters

SEABA Cup
The following was the roster for the 2016 SEABA Cup.

 

|}
| style="vertical-align:top;" |
 Head coach
 Nash Racela
 Assistant coaches
 Michael Oliver
 Joshua Vincent Racela

Legend
(C) Team captain
Club – describes lastclub before the tournament
Age – describes ageon 22 May 2016
|}

FIBA World Olympic Qualifying Tournament
The following was the 12-man roster of the Philippines national team for the 2016 FIBA World Olympic Qualifying Tournament.

 

|}
| style="vertical-align:top;" |
 Head coach
 Tab Baldwin
 Assistant coaches
 Jimmy Alapag
 Alex Compton
 Jong Uichico
 Naxto Lezcano
 Josh Reyes
 Team manager
 Butch Antonio

Legend
(C) Team captain
(IN) Inactive
(NP) Naturalized Player
Club – describes lastclub before the tournament
Age – describes ageon 4 July 2016
|}

FIBA Asia Challenge
This was the 12-man roster of the Philippines national team for the 2016 FIBA Asia Challenge.

|}
| style="vertical-align:top;" |
 Head coach
 Josh Reyes
 Assistant coaches
 Mike Oliver
 Team manager
 Butch Antonio

Legend
(C) Team captain
(NP) Naturalized Player
Club – describes lastclub before the tournament
Age – describes ageon 9 September 2016
|}

See also
2015 Philippines national basketball team results

Notes

References

Philippines men's national basketball team results
2016–17 in Philippine basketball
2015–16 in Philippine basketball